The 2018–19 Stade Rennais season was the 117th professional season of the club since its creation in 1901. During this campaign the club competed in the following competitions: Ligue 1, Coupe de France, Coupe de la Ligue, UEFA Europa League. In 2018-19, Rennes competed in the European competition for the first time since 2008-09, when the club made the qualifying rounds of the UEFA Cup. This time around the club enjoyed greater success, reaching the Round of 16.

Players

Out on loan

Competitions

Ligue 1

League table

Results summary

Results by round

Matches

Coupe de la Ligue

Coupe de France

UEFA Europa League

Group stage

Knockout phase

Round of 32

Round of 16

Statistics

Appearances and goals

|-
! colspan=14 style=background:#dcdcdc; text-align:center| Goalkeepers

|-
! colspan=14 style=background:#dcdcdc; text-align:center| Defenders

|-
! colspan=14 style=background:#dcdcdc; text-align:center| Midfielders

|-
! colspan=14 style=background:#dcdcdc; text-align:center| Forwards

|-
! colspan=14 style=background:#dcdcdc; text-align:center| Players transferred out during the season

References

Stade Rennais F.C. seasons
Stade Rennais F.C.
Stade Rennais F.C.